A coronal stop is a stop consonant articulated with the front part of the tongue (whence "coronal"). Depending on the precise place of articulation, several types can be distinguished:
 Dental stops, articulated with the tongue touching the upper teeth
 Alveolar stops, articulated with the tongue touching the alveolar ridge behind the upper teeth
 Postalveolar stops, articulated with the tongue touching the back of the alveolar ridge

Coronal consonants
Plosives